Sarah Wister (July 20, 1761 – April 21, 1804) was a girl living in Pennsylvania during the American Revolution.  She is principally known as the author of Sally Wister's Journal, written when she was sixteen; it is a firsthand account of life in the nearby countryside during the British occupation of Philadelphia in 1777–78.

Family and early life
Sarah (Sally) Wister was born July 20, 1761, in the house of her paternal grandfather in Philadelphia.  She was the first child of Daniel Wister and Lowery Jones (d. 1804) of Philadelphia. Her grandfather was John Wister, son of Hans Caspar Wüster (1671–1726) and younger brother of Caspar Wistar the elder, who had emigrated from Baden to join his brother in Philadelphia in 1727.  John Wister adopted the Quaker faith and became a successful wine merchant and landowner; he built the house now known as Grumblethorpe in Germantown as a summer home in 1744.  His second wife was Anna Catherine Rubenkam, of Wanfried, Germany.  Their one son was Daniel (1738/9–1805).

Sally's mother, Lowery Jones, was the daughter of Susanna Evans and Owen Jones (Sr.), of Wynnewood, Lower Merion. Jones was the granddaughter of Gainor Owen and Jonathan Jones and the great-granddaughter of Mary Wynne (daughter of Dr. Thomas Wynne) and Dr. Edward Jones.  Sally was their first child.

Not much is known of Sally Wister's early life.  She attended a girls' school run by the Quaker philanthropist Anthony Benezet.  Her writings show some knowledge of French and Latin, and she was clearly familiar with the literature of her time, particularly poetry, and especially Alexander Pope. It was at the Benezet school that young Sally met the future historian and memoirist Deborah Norris, whom she called Debby. She was also friends with Polly Fishbourne, Sally Jones, Anna Rawle, Peggy Rawle, and Sally Burge.  The girls formed a "social circle" and exchanged numerous letters during the summers.

Flight and the Journal

In 1776, during the American Revolutionary War, the British army occupied New York and much of New Jersey.  In 1777, the army moved to take Philadelphia, the capital and principal city of the Thirteen Colonies.  With the city threatened, many Philadelphians fled.  Daniel Wister's family of seven fled to the North Wales, Pennsylvania (Gwynedd Township), home of Hannah Foulke, a widow whose son had married a sister of Lowery Wister and whom Sally knew as "Aunt Hanna[h]"  The main house is located a few hundred meters east of Wissahickon Creek, where the Penllyn station has been built; the Foulkes' mill stood nearby.  The Wisters probably arrived about late 1776; they were certainly there by early 1777. Sally kept up correspondence with at least Debby Norris and a few others.

Two weeks after the Battle of Brandywine, on September 25, 1777, when the fall of Philadelphia (and disruption of mail) was imminent, Sally Wister, then aged sixteen, began keeping "a sort of journal of the time that may expire", which took the form of letters to Debby Norris, as letters would no longer reach her. She hoped that the letters would give her friend "pleasure" "some time hence"  (As it turned out, Norris did not see the letters written to her for many years, after Sally Wister had died.)

The letters, written Quaker-style, use numbers for the days of the week (Sunday is "First Day", etc.), and show the thoughts, hopes, and fears of a sixteen-year-old in wartime.  She sometimes wears womanly clothes, awkwardly preferring "the girlish dress"; other times, she revels in her budding womanhood.  The journal covers nine months, a span of time that included the capture of Philadelphia, the surrender of Burgoyne at Saratoga, the encampment at Valley Forge, the Conway Cabal, and the eventual British evacuation of Philadelphia.  The battles of Germantown, Whitemarsh, and Barren Hill were fought relatively close to North Wales, but the Wisters remained safe, although there were moments of trepidation. Sally hears gunfire on December 7, and her next journal entry begins "Rejoice with us, my dear.  The British have return'd to the city.  Charming news this."

While they avoided battles, the inhabitants of the Foulke farm saw many troop movements, and a substantial number of Continental army officers were billeted in the house, or visited those who were.  Visitors included General William Smallwood, commander of the Maryland troops (who made the house his headquarters), Colonel James Wood of Virginia, and Major Aaron Ogden of New Jersey.  All three of these later became governors of their home states.

Sally and some of the other girls enjoy flirtations with some of the younger officers and, in league with some, play a trick on another.  She appears to be falling in love with Major William Truman Stoddert, "about nineteen" and a nephew of Gen. Smallwood.  After a few weeks, the soldiers receive orders to march; Sally is "very sorry" and Stoddert "looks dull".  Stoddert returns a month later, ill with a cold and fever; he is nursed back to health and leaves again, but soon returns, "not relishing the idea of sleeping on the banks of the Schuylkill".  However, he does not stay long, and when he leaves, Sally observes "we shall not, I fancy, see him again for months, perhaps years".  Any romance between them would have been problematic: "A wide gulf of social and religious prejudice lay between them", as he was an Anglican, a soldier, and a member of a slaveowning family, while she was a pacifist Quaker, a member of a sect that forbade its members from marrying out of the faith or owning slaves.

In between these periods of excitement were stretches of boredom.  On December 20, Sally observes "I shall hang up my pen till something offers worth relating."  Her next entry is not until February.  Winter passes uneventfully.  As it draws to a close, Sally and a friend go to look over the remains of the nearby army camp, which she describes as "ragged" and "ruinous".  She skips from March to May, both for "scarcity of paper" and "hardly anything" of news.  With the advancing season come rumors of an imminent evacuation of Philadelphia (and unwanted attention from another officer).  On June 19 comes word that the occupying army has left; the Continentals depart in pursuit, and Sally, "think[ing] of nothing but returning to Philadelphia", concludes her journal.

Afterward

The Wister family returned home to Philadelphia in July 1778.  Upon the death of Sally's grandfather, John Wister, in 1789, her father took up residence in the family summer house in Germantown.  Sally Wister lived there the rest of her life, dying April 21, 1804. She was more withdrawn in later life and "much occupied with religious matters". As far as is known, she never saw Major Stoddert again, and she died unmarried.  Benjamin Rush noted her death in the Philadelphia Gazette, lauding her "prudence, virtue, piety, and eminent acquirements".

Although a number of the soldiers noted in the journal did not survive the war, Stoddert did, although "much indispos'd" as of 1780.  He returned to Maryland, married a woman named Sally, and died "from the lingering effects of the hardships of camp life" in 1793.

The letters constituting the journal, 48 pages in all, remained at the Wister house until about 1830, years after their author's death. At that time her brother Charles Wister loaned them to Debby Norris, by then the married Deborah (Mrs. George) Logan of Stenton.  The journal as a whole was not widely published until 1902, although excerpts were published earlier or in restricted circulation.  The book received favorable reviews, with The New York Times praising the "exhaustive biographical notes" published with it. According to The Athenaeum:

References
Notes

Bibliography
Derounian, Kathryn Zabelle, ed., The Journal and Occasional Writings of Sarah Wister, Associated University Presses, 1987. Partial copy here
Myers, Albert Cook, ed., Introduction, Sally Wister's Journal: A True Narrative: Being a Quaker Maiden's Account of Her Experiences with Officers of the Continental Army, 1777–1778. Ferris & Leach, Philadelphia, 1902. Full text available here
Jenkins, Howard M., "Gwynedd in the Midst of the Revolution: Sally Wister's Journal", Historical Collections of Gwynedd, Chapter XIX, 1897.
Wister, Sarah, Sally Wister's Journal: A True Narrative: Being a Quaker Maiden's Account of Her Experiences with Officers of the Continental Army, 1777-1778.  Applewood Books, Bedford, Massachusetts, 1994.  .
Sally Wister, et al., "Journal of Miss Sally Wister", ''The Pennsylvania Magazine of History and Biography, Vol. 9, No. 3 (Oct., 1885), pp. 318–333.

1761 births
1804 deaths
American diarists
Women diarists
Writers from Philadelphia
Wister family
People of colonial Pennsylvania
American people of German descent
People of Pennsylvania in the American Revolution
American women non-fiction writers
18th-century American women writers
18th-century diarists